Kult or KULT may refer to:

 KULT: The Temple of Flying Saucers, computer adventure game
 KULT-LP, a low-power radio station (94.5 FM) licensed to Cedar Rapids, Iowa, United States
 Kult (role-playing game), role-playing game
 Kult (card game), collectible card game
 Kult (band), Polish rock band
 KULT, an mnemonic for causes of high anion gap metabolic acidosis